"The Personality of the Deity" is a sermon written and delivered by Henry Ware Jr.

Background
Ware presented the sermon on September 23, 1838, in the chapel of Harvard University. He intended it as a response to Ralph Waldo Emerson's Divinity School Address, delivered a few months earlier. Because of the wide circulation of Emerson's address among non-Divinity students, Ware found it necessary, after a lengthy exchange of letters with Emerson, to present his response to the entire University community during the next term.

The sermon refuted some of Emerson's pantheist ideas and reasserted, as the title suggests, the willful personality of God. The sermon is generally regarded as one of Ware's best works and marks a turning point in the perceptions of true Unitarianism. Where it had previously been portrayed as liberal or even radical by the Trinitarians who had just fifty years before controlled the University, the departure of the Trinitarians and the rise of both transcendentalism and secular humanism now made Unitarianism the conservative position.

Although widely condemned by University faculty, Emerson's address was very popular among students, many of whom, as Unitarian ministers, led their congregations towards Emerson's ideology. Accordingly, Ware's sermon never received the wide attention and study that Emerson's address did.

References

External links 

 Henry Ware Jr. The Personality of the Deity Folson, Wells, and Thurston 1838
 Memoir of the Life of Henry Ware Junior Boston: American Unitarian Association. 1880

Christian sermons
Harvard Divinity School
1838 in Massachusetts
1838 speeches
September 1838 events